Ukraine competed at the 1997 Winter Universiade in Muju and Chonju, South Korea. Ukraine won 4 medals: two silver and two bronze medals.

Medallists

Alpine skiing

Ukrainians did not compete in alpine skiing.

Figure skating

See also
 Ukraine at the 1997 Summer Universiade

References

Sources
 Results

Ukraine at the Winter Universiade
Winter Universiade
1997 Winter Universiade